Veliki Cerovec ( or ) is a settlement in the Gorjanci Hills in the Municipality of Novo Mesto in southeastern Slovenia. The area is part of the traditional region of Lower Carniola and is now included in the Southeast Slovenia Statistical Region.

The local church is dedicated to Saints Primus and Felician and belongs to the Parish of Stopiče. It was a medieval building that was extensively restyled in the Baroque style in the 18th century.

References

External links
Veliki Cerovec on Geopedia

Populated places in the City Municipality of Novo Mesto